Zimbabwe has a centralised government and is divided into eight provinces and two cities with provincial status, for administrative purposes. Each province has a provincial capital from where official business is usually carried out.

The names of most of the provinces were generated from the Mashonaland and Matabeleland divide at the time of colonisation: Mashonaland was the territory occupied first by the British South Africa Company Pioneer Column and Matabeleland the territory conquered during the First Matabele War. This corresponds roughly to the precolonial territory of the Shona people and the Matabele people, although there are significant ethnic minorities in most provinces. Each province is headed by a Provincial Governor, appointed by the President. The provincial government is run by a Provincial Administrator, appointed by the Public Service Commission. Other government functions at provincial level are carried out by provincial offices of national government departments.

The provinces are subdivided into 59 districts and 1,200 wards (sometimes referred to as municipalities). Each district is headed by a District Administrator, appointed by the Public Service Commission. There is also a Rural District Council, which appoints a Chief Executive Officer. The Rural District Council comprises elected ward councillors, the District Administrator and one representative of the chiefs (traditional leaders appointed under customary law) in the district. Other government functions at district level are carried out by district offices of national government departments.

At ward level there is a Ward Development Committee, comprising the elected ward councillor, the kraalheads (traditional leaders subordinate to chiefs) and representatives of Village Development Committees. Wards are subdivided into villages, each of which has an elected Village Development Committee and a Headman (traditional leader subordinate to the kraalhead).

References 

 
Zimbabwe
Zimbabwe